Michael Snowden (born 18 December 1987) is an Australian rugby union footballer. His regular playing position is scrum-half. Having previously played club rugby for Eastwood in the Shute Shield, he was named in the Western Force Extended Playing Squad for the 2013 Super Rugby season before playing with Waikato in the 2013 ITM Cup.  Mick returned to Super Rugby with the Melbourne Rebels for the 2016 season where he made two appearances from the bench, before re-signing with the club for the 2017 season.

After roughly 10 months hiatus from Rugby, Snowden was signed by the NSW Waratahs after impressing in a trial. He made a winning debut on the 20 of March 2018 against his former side Melbourne Rebels. A fitting reward as he was frustrated by a lack of first team chances at Rebels in 2017. At 30 years old it was also the first time Snowden's father had seen him play Super Rugby.

Super Rugby statistics

References 

Living people
1987 births
Australian rugby union players
Rugby union scrum-halves
Western Force players
Melbourne Rebels players
Waikato rugby union players
New South Wales Country Eagles players
Melbourne Rising players
New South Wales Waratahs players
Australian expatriate rugby union players
Expatriate rugby union players in New Zealand
Rugby union players from New South Wales